Toast is a British biographical comedy-drama film written and directed by S. J. Clarkson, it is based on the autobiographical novel of the same name by the cookery writer Nigel Slater. The cast includes Freddie Highmore, Helena Bonham Carter, Ken Stott and Oscar Kennedy.
It received a gala at the 2011 Berlin Film Festival. As a television film it was first broadcast on BBC One on 30 December 2010 and was given a theatrical release in cinemas on 11 August 2011.

In 2018, it was adapted for stage by Henry Filloux-Bennett. It first premiered at Week 53 Festival in March with a subsequent run at the Edinburgh Festival Fringe. In April 2019, it opened in London at The Other Palace.

Plot
The Slaters, consisting of Mr and Mrs. Slater, along with their young son Nigel, live in their Wolverhampton home. Their daily life revolves mostly around Mr. Slater's job at the factory and Mrs. Slater's homemaking, which is constantly hindered by her chronic debilitating asthma, while her cooking is limited to heating canned goods. Although Nigel finds comfort and encouragement to nourish his interest in culinary matters from his gentle mother, he struggles to connect with his cantankerous father, who often criticises him. He also has a crush on the handsome gardener. Whenever dinner is burnt, the standard substitute of toast is always served, which leaves a deep impression on the boy. Eventually, his mother succumbs to the illness, leaving her husband stumbling through widowhood with the same heated canned foods, frequent dinners of toast sprinkled with occasional attempts by Nigel per his friend's advice to connect with his father.

The new housekeeper, married and "common" Mrs. Joan Potter, enters their life and draws Mr. Slater's attention with her sublime meals. The two start to embrace a romantic relationship despite Nigel's disdain for Mrs. Potter and Mrs. Potter's marriage. Without announcement, the Slaters move to the Herefordshire countryside along with Mrs. Potter and Nigel finds himself begrudgingly forced to co-exist with Mrs. Potter. Once he reaches teenage years, Nigel shows passion and culinary talent during home economics class cookery lessons. This prompts a silent competition for Mr. Slater's approval between the teen and Mrs. Potter that erupts when Nigel manages to bake a lemon meringue pie that rivals Mrs. Potter's supposedly unbeatable dessert.

Mr. Slater eventually marries Joan and becomes more unbearable from the excessive consumption of Mrs. Potter's cooking. Nigel reaches a boiling point with his stepmother when he starts working at the local pub's restaurant to hone his skills in more sophisticated cooking, which she perceives as a threat. One day, while on a walk in the woods with the pub owner's son, who is training at ballet school, Nigel and the young man share a kiss, stirring Nigel's sexual awareness. He encourages Nigel to take a chance at the world beyond his home.

Nigel, upon being informed by Joan of his father's death, declares to the newly widowed woman that she has won and resolves to move to London and establish his own life. At The Savoy Hotel, he is interviewed for a kitchen job by a toast snacking chef and hired, much to his disbelief. Nigel is reassured of his future by the chef, who gives him a chef's jacket embroidered with "Savoy London" and Nigel cracks a smile.

Cast

Production
The chief filming location was in Birmingham and Worcestershire with the Black Country Living Museum transformed into 1960's Wolverhampton, and in Walton Pool House in Clent. Principal sets were constructed in a disused bank on Broad St. The only inclement weather encountered during filming was at Penarth which resulted in script changes to reflect the cold wet conditions. Filming lasted 1 month, from 21 June to 24 July 2010.

Reviews
Writing for the Seattle Times, Tom Keogh gave the film 3 out of 4 stars, stating that "the movie has three things deserving of adoration: spectacular lemon-meringue pies, the songs of Dusty Springfield and Helena Bonham Carter". Gary Goldstein of the Los Angeles Times wrote that "Toast is by turns sweet and tart, airy and rich and, above all, a thoroughly irresistible confection", giving the movie 4 out of 5 stars. In a more mild review, Stephanie Merry of the Washington Post wrote: "For the most part, the movie feels like an emotional vacuum, mirroring the drab vanilla and mint green interiors of the Slaters' home".

Toast currently holds a 62% approval on Rotten Tomatoes.

References

External links
 
 Review, Leicester Mercury

2010 television films
2010 films
2010 biographical drama films
2010 comedy-drama films
2010 directorial debut films
2010 LGBT-related films
2010s English-language films
BBC television dramas
Biographical films about LGBT people
British LGBT-related television films
British biographical drama films
British comedy-drama television films
Cooking films
Films about father–son relationships
Films based on autobiographies
Films set in England
Films shot in Wales
Films shot in Worcestershire
Films directed by S. J. Clarkson
Films produced by Alison Owen
Films with screenplays by Lee Hall (playwright)
LGBT-related comedy-drama films
2010s British films